was a Japanese painter born in Osaka Prefecture, Japan in 1908. He lived for some time in Kamakura before his death in Tokyo in 1987. He is well known for his paintings of nude women, Buddhist images, and floral designs.

Early life

After he graduated one of the art colleges in Kyoto, he worked as a designer of Kimono texture for traditional Japanese clothes. He started to be a painter and taught by Nishiyama Suisho (1879-1958).

It was during this time that he met his wife-to-be, Tatsu Hirota, who was also studying as a painter under Nishiyama. The couple had two children, a son and a daughter.

Career

He exhibited his painting of the birth of his son, "Dan-ji-umaru" and won a top prize at Shin-Bunten in 1941.

In 1974, he became a member of The Creative Painting Society, Soga-kai. Many of his works are in The Historical Museum of Izumisano city where he was born.

His paintings show the beauty of the human body. The Fuyu is famous and regarded as his best work. Kuma also produced beautiful floral designs in woodblock prints and silk.

References

External links
Photo of the artist
Shinbunten

1908 births
1987 deaths
People from Osaka Prefecture
Japanese painters